Naorem James Singh (born 1 February 1993) is an Indian professional footballer who plays as a defender for Bharat FC in the I-League.

Career

Early career
Born in Imphal, Manipur, Singh began his football career with the Mohun Bagan youth set-up. He then joined the Pune F.C. Academy where he won the 2012 I-League U20 title with the side. After spending time with Pune, Singh joined Kenkre in the I-League 2nd Division.

Bharat FC
In early 2015 it was announced that Singh had signed for new direct-entry I-League side Bharat FC for the 2014–15 season. He made his professional debut for the club on 24 January 2015 against Dempo. Singh started the match and played one half as Bharat FC drew the match 0–0.

Career statistics

References

External links 
 Bharat FC profile.

1993 births
Living people
People from Imphal
Indian footballers
Bharat FC players
Association football defenders
Footballers from Manipur
I-League 2nd Division players
I-League players
Pune FC players
Mohun Bagan AC players